Telmatogetoninae is a subfamily of midges in the non-biting midge family (Chironomidae).

Genera & species
Genus Telmatogeton Schiner, 1866
T. abnormis (Terry, 1913)
T. alaskensis Coquillett, 1900
T. atlanticum Oliveira, 1950
T. australicus Womersley, 1936
T. fluviatilis Wirth, 1947
T. hirtus Wirth, 1947
T. japonicus Tokunaga, 1933
T. latipennis Wirth, 1949
T. macswaini Wirth, 1949
T. minor Kieffer, 1914
T. namum Oliveira, 1950
T. pacificus Tokunaga, 1935
T. pectinatus (Deby, 1889)  
T. pusillum Edwards, 1933
T. sanctipauli Schiner, 1866
T. torrenticola (Terry, 1913)
T. trilobatus (Kieffer, 1911)
T. trochanteratum Edwards, 1931
T. williamsi Wirth, 1947
Genus Thalassomya Schiner, 1856
T. africana Edwards, 1926
T. bureni Wirth, 1949
T. frauenfeldi Schiner, 1856
T. japonica Tokunaga & Komyo, 1996
T. longipes Johnson, 1924
T. maritima Wirth, 1947
T. pilipes Edwards, 1928
T. sabroskyi Tokunaga, 1964
T. setosipennis Wirth, 1947

References

Chironomidae
Nematocera subfamilies